Mariano Sambucetti (born 23 October 1979 in Buenos Aires, Argentina) was a professional rugby union player for Bristol Bears (2004-2014) in the Aviva Premiership and IPA Championship. Mariano Sambucetti's position of choice is at lock. 

He has also represented Argentina getting his first cap in 2001, making 14 appearances for his country and taking part in the historic draw against British and Irish Lions in 2005 at The Millennium Stadium. 

Mariano played 199 (156 League) games for Bristol Bears Rugby - making him one of the most capped players for the club in its professional history and a definite fans favourite being voted Supporters Club Man of the year by the Bristolian fans. 

He was also a Sky Sports pundit for the Rugby Championship alongside Sean Fitzpatrick, Michael Lynagh and Thinas Delport.

During 2014 and 2015 Mariano was involved with the Brazilian National team coaching staff as forwards coach. During this spell they had famous victories over USA, Paraguay and Argentina.

Since retiring in 2014 Mariano has pursued a career in International Trade and Development alongside former Argentinean international prop Marcos Ayerza.

External links
Bristol Rugby profile

1979 births
Living people
Bristol Bears players
Argentine rugby union players
Argentina international rugby union players
Rugby union locks
Argentine people of Italian descent
Rugby union players from Buenos Aires